Eva Hrdinová (born 15 June 1984) is a Czech former tennis player.

In her career, Hrdinová won three singles and 19 doubles titles on the ITF Circuit. On 14 April 2008, she reached her best singles ranking of world No. 168. On 18 August 2008, she peaked at No. 55 in the WTA doubles rankings.

Grand Slam performance timeline

Singles

Doubles

WTA career finals

Doubles: 5 (5 runner-ups)

ITF Circuit finals

Singles: 12 (3–9)

Doubles: 39 (19-20)

Notes

References

External links

 
 

1984 births
Living people
Sportspeople from Plzeň
Czech female tennis players
Universiade medalists in tennis
Universiade gold medalists for the Czech Republic
Medalists at the 2005 Summer Universiade
Medalists at the 2007 Summer Universiade